KZBV 91.3 FM is a radio station licensed to Carmel Valley, California. The station broadcasts a Christian AC format branded "Aware FM" and is owned by Aware FM, Inc.

Translator
KZBV's programming is rebroadcast on translator 91.7 K219LL, licensed to Chualar, California and serving Salinas, California.

History
The station was first licensed in 2013. Its construction permit was originally held by Colina Alta Ministries and was donated to One Ministries, Inc. in 2010. In 2013, KZBV was sold to Aware FM, Inc., along with its translator K219LL, for $90,000. On August 25, 2020, the station and its translator were taken off the air due to damage caused by a wildfire. It resumed operations on August 20, 2021.

References

External links

ZBV
Contemporary Christian radio stations in the United States
Radio stations established in 2013
2013 establishments in California